Lady Anne Brewis  (26 March 1911 – 31 March 2002), was an English botanist. She was a daughter of Roundell Cecil Palmer, 3rd Earl of Selborne.

As a child, Brewis had spent long holidays studying the orchids on Noar Hill, near Selborne. This led her to study the works of Gilbert White, and eventually to a degree in Zoology at Somerville College, Oxford. Her marriage to John Brewis took her to many localities before returning to Hampshire on her husband's retirement. 

Over the next 27 years, she meticulously catalogued hundreds of species, and co-authored the definitive guide to Hampshire's plant life. Every summer she would organise botanical safaris for local children.

Bibliography

The Flora of Hampshire, Bowman P, Brewis A,  Mabey R, Rose F. 1996. Harley Books. . (This 1996 book was preceded by the Flora of Hampshire, 2nd edition, 1904 by Frederick Townsend.)
Natural History of Selborne, White G. 1789 (repr: 1977) Penguin London,   Hampshire''(1996).

References

Women botanists
English botanists
1911 births
2002 deaths
Alumni of Somerville College, Oxford
Daughters of British earls
Members of the Order of the British Empire
20th-century British women scientists
People from Selborne